William Ortiz-Alvarado (also William Ortiz Alvarado or William Ortiz; born 1947 in Salinas, Puerto Rico) is an American composer of contemporary classical music, musician, and educator. He was raised in New York City.

After studying composition with at the Puerto Rico Conservatory of Music, he received his M.A. from Stony Brook University. He was later granted the Ph.D. in Composition from the University at Buffalo.

Ortiz-Alvarado has an extensive catalog of works for orchestra and chamber ensemble.

References

External links

William Ortiz page from New Music Jukebox site

1947 births
Living people
Male classical composers
People from Salinas, Puerto Rico
20th-century classical composers
Puerto Rican composers
Puerto Rican male composers
Stony Brook University alumni
University at Buffalo alumni
20th-century American male musicians